Beecham is a surname. Notable people with the surname include:

 Audrey Beecham (1915–1989), poet and niece of the conductor
 Betty Humby Beecham (1908–1958), British pianist and wife of the conductor
 Earl Beecham (born 1965), American football player
 Emily Beecham (born 1984), English actress
 Ernie Beecham (1906–1985), English footballer
 Jeremy Beecham (born 1944), British Labour politician
 John Beecham (1787–1856), English Wesleyan writer
 Sir Joseph Beecham, 1st Baronet (1848–1916), eldest son of Thomas Beecham the chemist
 Thomas Beecham (1879–1961), British conductor
 Thomas Beecham (chemist) (1820–1907), British chemist, grandfather of the conductor
 Sinclair Beecham, British entrepreneur

See also 
 Beecham baronets, a baronetcy created for Joseph Beecham
 Beecham Group, a British pharmaceutical business founded Thomas Beecham, now part of GlaxoSmithKline 
 Beecham's Pills. a laxative and first product 
 Beacham
 Beauchamp (disambiguation)